Poets who wrote or write much of their poetry in Slovene.

See also
List of Slovenian writers
Slovenian literature
List of Slovenian writers and poets in Hungary
List of Slovenes
List of poets

Slovene
Poets